Eupithecia iterata is a moth in the family Geometridae first described by András Mátyás Vojnits in 1980. It is found in Tibet.

References

Moths described in 1980
iterata
Moths of Asia